The women's competition in the lightweight (– 58 kg) division was held on 18 and 19 September 2010.

Schedule

Medalists

Records

Results

References
(Page 33) Start List
Results

- Women's 58 kg, 2010 World Weightlifting Championships
2010 in women's weightlifting